Moose Jaw Arena was an indoor arena in Moose Jaw, Saskatchewan, Canada. It was built in 1910 and was the home of the Moose Jaw Sheiks and Moose Jaw Maroons of the WCHL and Moose Jaw Canucks of the WCJHL. The arena was destroyed by a fire in August 1955. It was eventually replaced by the Moose Jaw Civic Centre.

References

Buildings and structures in Moose Jaw
Defunct indoor arenas in Canada
Defunct indoor ice hockey venues in Canada
Sports venues in Saskatchewan
Sport in Moose Jaw